Sodari is a 1955 Indian Kannada-language film directed by T. V. Singh Thakur. The film stars Pandari Bai, Narasimha Raju and Rajkumar. The music for the film was composed by Padmanabha Shasthri.
The story of the film is based on the life of Hemavati, the pious wife of King Kailasanatha. She faces numerous hardships along with her children when Kailasanatha loses his kingdom due to a drought. The actress Jayashree plays a negative role of Chanchaladevi, a cunning relative of Hemavati. The movie is based on GV Iyer's stage play Anna Thangi  which was based on the popular legend of Nalla Thangaal whose story had earlier been adapted in Malayalam in 1950 as Nalla Thanka and later in Tamil as Nalla Thangal (1955).

Cast
 Pandari Bai as Hemavati
 Jayashree as Chanchaladevi
 Indira Acharya as Chandrika
 Lakshmidevi as Geeta
 Rajkumar as Kailasanatha
 Raghavendra Rao
 G. V. Iyer as Sarvaantaryami
 Narasimharaju as Madana

Soundtrack
The music of the film was composed by Padmanabha Shasthri, with lyrics penned by Hunsur Krishnamurthy.

References

External links
 
 Sodari (1955) on Chiloka

1955 films
1950s Kannada-language films
Films scored by Padmanabha Shastri
Indian black-and-white films